The American Volleyball Coaches Association (AVCA) is an organization of over 6,000 members, incorporated as a private non-profit educational corporation in 1981, as the Collegiate Volleyball Coaches Association. It is currently headquartered in Lexington, Kentucky.

The original members of the AVCA were intercollegiate coaches who banded together to form this particular coaching body. In 1986, during the San Francisco convention, the membership recognized the growing and developing high school and club communities. The name of the association was then changed to reflect these growing constituencies. The original Collegiate Volleyball Coaches Association was renamed the American Volleyball Coaches Association with the intent of responding to and serving all volleyball coaches.

The organization produces a number of publications including Coaching Volleyball Magazine, "Coaching Volleyball 2.0," "Phenom," AVCA at the Net, Volleyball Ace PowerTips and VolleyBiz.

The organization also produces a weekly national poll for collegiate volleyball similar to how the Associated Press makes a poll for NCAA Division I Football Bowl Subdivision.

History
Although incorporated as a non-profit in 1981, the AVCA began to grow and diversify, and a full-time executive director wasn't  hired until July 1983. An associate director was hired in April 1986 and an administrative assistant in September 1988.

The Association moved from San Mateo, California, to Colorado Springs, Colorado, in August 1992. The staff has increased to the following positions: executive director, assistant executive director, director of operations, assistant director of events and public relations, manager of awards and membership, manager of communications, sales manager, editor and awards and membership specialist.

In 1986, the board was increased to 13 members, due to new membership increases averaging out at about 150 per year. In 1988, a boom of 106% new memberships occurred. Since 1986, high school membership has more than tripled. The AVCA has members in all 50 states and the District of Columbia, as well as, numerous international members. At the collegiate level, all major NCAA conferences are represented and membership among the club coaches has risen dramatically.

In July 2006 the association moved its headquarters to Lexington, Kentucky and entered into an association management partnership with Associations International (formally Host Communications then IMG College).  The current president of the AVCA is Anne Kordes (head coach - University of Louisville). The Executive Director is Kathleen J. DeBoer and the Assistant Executive Director is Jason Jones.

AVCA events

Beach volleyball championship
The beach volleyball championship was introduced to the women's collegiate scene by CBS College Sports with the Collegiate Nationals, an event founded by the network in the spring of 2006 to broadcast the national championships of several "action sports." The event was sponsored by the CBS College Sports Network, American Volleyball Coaches Association (AVCA) and the Association of Volleyball Professionals (AVP).

In 2006, the AVP sanctioned a combine that selected 8 players from 8 colleges and paired them into teams (title was won by Bibiana Candelas (USC)/Paula Gentil (Minnesota)).  In 2007 Nebraska (Jordan Larson/Sarah Pavan) won an invitational competition of 8 colleges, which featured only two players per school, as opposed to entire teams.  2008 saw Texas win an invitational, sponsored by AVCA and AVP, involving 6 schools with four doubles squads each. In 2009, USC prevailed over an invited field of 8 colleges with four doubles squads each.  In 2010, the competition reverted to one doubles squad per school, with 12 colleges invited; it was won by Loyola Marymount (Emily Day/Heather Hughes).  The two-player team format continued in 2011, except that players were paired with different partners from other schools for every match, until the semi-final winners were determined. That year there was also a men's competition in the same format.

In 2010 the NCAA categorized women's beach volleyball as an "emerging sport." Beginning in the spring of 2012 the AVCA began sponsoring a national championship tournament for women's collegiate beach volleyball.  The AVCA has separate brackets for teams and for individual pairs. The champions of the team tournaments are:
 2012 – Pepperdine
 2013 – Long Beach State
 2014 – Pepperdine
 2015 – USC
The NCAA granted full sponsorship to beach volleyball in all three NCAA divisions, with the first NCAA championship being held in May, 2016.

AVCA Showcase tournament

From 1995 to 2012, the AVCA put on an annual tournament held in the beginning of each season, called the AVCA Showcase. Through 2011, four teams, usually ranked in the top 15, competed for the AVCA Showcase title. As of 2007, the showcase champion had gone on to the NCAA Final Four 10 times out of 13. The only time the winner failed to advance to the Final Four was Colorado State in 2000, Texas in 2006 and Nebraska in 2007. However, only twice has the showcase champion won the NCAA Championship: Long Beach State in 1998 and Southern California in 2003.

In 2012, the Showcase featured four collegiate teams competing in one match each against the Chinese Volleyball League champion, Jiangsu.

Past sponsors include NACWAA, Runza Restaurants, Rockvale Outlets and State Farm.

Both Big West volleyball and Big Ten Conference volleyball have been prominently featured in this tournament throughout the years.

AVCA Awards
Given out annually for Division I, II, and III women and Division I/II (combined) and III for men, the following is a list of past awards for both men and women.

National Coach of the Year – Women's teams

Key

List of winners

Winners by school

Penn State leads all schools with 5 winners, while Nebraska is second with four winners. Stanford, UCLA, and Florida have 3 winners each. Hawai'i, Kentucky, BYU, and Northern Iowa follow with 2 winners each, while the remaining schools have had 1 winner.

National Assistant Coach of the Year – Women's teams
The AVC began awarding the Division I National Assistant Coach of the Year in 2009.
 2022: Dan Meske, Louisville
 2021: Brittany Dildine, Wisconsin
 2020: Leslie Gabriel, Washington
 2019: Angie Oxley Behrens, Creighton
 2018: Burdette Greeny, Washington State
 2017: Lindsey Gray-Walton, Kentucky
 2016: Dani Busboom Kelly, Nebraska
 2015: Laura "Bird" Kuhn, Kansas
 2014: Eva Rackham, North Carolina
 2013: Salima Rockwell, Texas
 2012: Denise Corlett, Stanford
 2011: Holly Watts, Florida State
 2010: Denise Corlett, Stanford
 2009: Kelly Files, Oklahoma

National Player of the Year – Women's
Since 1985, the AVCA has recognized the Division I national player(s) of the year.

Key

List of winners

Winners by school

Stanford leads all universities with 10 total selections (three co selections), followed by Long Beach State with 6 selections (one co), Nebraska, Penn State, and Hawai'i each have 4 selections. Ohio State (one co) and Southern California (USC) each have 2, while the remaining schools have had 1 winner.

National Freshman of the Year – Women's
Since 2001, the AVCA has recognized the Division I freshman player(s) of the year.

Key

List of winners

Winners by school

Penn State leads all universities with 4 selections, followed by Stanford, Florida, Nebraska, Ohio State, and Texas who each have 2 selections. The remaining schools have had 1 winner.

National Coach of the Year – Men's teams
For Division I/II men. Stanford (1991–92) and Penn State (2007–08) are the only schools in which both the men and women teams' coaches won the award in the same academic year.

 2022: Donan Cruz, Ball State
 2021: Rick McLaughlin, UCSB
 2020: No award given due to the COVID-19 pandemic
 2019: Charlie Wade, Hawai'i
 2018: Alan Knipe, Long Beach State
 2017: Alan Knipe, Long Beach State
 2016: Pete Hanson, Ohio State
 2015: Dan Friend, Lewis
 2014: Shane Davis, Loyola–Chicago
 2013: Chris McGown, BYU
 2012: Bill Ferguson, USC
 2011: Pete Hanson/David Kniffen Ohio State/UC Irvine
 2010: John Kosty, Stanford
 2009: Bill Ferguson, USC
 2008: Mark Pavlik, Penn State
 2007: Arnie Ball, IPFW
 2006: John Speraw, UC Irvine
 2005: Marv Dunphy, Pepperdine
 2004: Alan Knipe, Long Beach State
 2003: Dave Deuser, Lewis
 2002: Mike Wilton, Hawai'i
 2001: Carl McGown, BYU
 2000: Pete Hanson, Ohio State
 1999: Carl McGown, BYU
 1998: Al Scates, UCLA
 1997: Ruben Nieves, Stanford
 1996: Al Scates, UCLA
 1995: Don Shondell, Ball State
 1994: Tom Peterson, Penn State
 1993: Al Scates, UCLA
 1992: Ruben Nieves, Stanford
 1991: Ray Ratelle, Long Beach State

National Player of the Year – Men's
Long Beach State, Hawai'i, Penn State, Stanford, BYU, UCLA and Ohio State are the only universities in which a male and female volleyball player was named the AVCA NPOY. Pepperdine and Long Beach State lead with seven selections, followed by Hawai'i with four and UCLA with three.
 2022: Alex Nikolov (Long Beach State)
 2021: Rado Parapunov (Hawai'i)
 2020: Gabi Garcia Fernandez (BYU)
 2019: T.J. DeFalco (Long Beach State)
 2018: Joshua Tuaniga (Long Beach State)
 2017: T.J. DeFalco (Long Beach State)
 2016: Nicolas Szerszeń (Ohio State)
 2015: Thomas Jaeschke (Loyola-Chicago)
 2014: Taylor Sander (BYU)
 2013: Taylor Crabb (Long Beach State)
 2012: Tony Ciarelli (USC)
 2011: Murphy Troy (USC)
 2010: Kawika Shoji (Stanford)
 2009: Paul Carroll (Pepperdine)
 2008: Matt Anderson (Penn State); Paul Lotman (Long Beach State)
 2007: Jonathan Winder (Pepperdine)
 2006: Jayson Jablonsky (UC Irvine)
 2005: Sean Rooney (Pepperdine)
 2004: Carlos Moreno (Brigham Young University)
 2003: Costas Theocharidis (Hawai’i)
 2002: Brad Keenan (Pepperdine)
 2001: Costas Theocharidis (Hawai’i)
 2000: Donald Suxho (USC)
 1999: George Roumain (Pepperdine)
 1998: George Roumain (Pepperdine)
 1997: Ivan Contreras (Penn State)
 1996: Yuval Katz (Hawai’i), Stein Metzger (UCLA)
 1995: Jeff Nygaard (UCLA)
 1994: Jeff Nygaard (UCLA)
 1993: Canyon Ceman (Stanford)
 1992: Brent Hilliard (Long Beach State)
 1991: Bryan Ivie (USC)

West Region Coach of the Year – Women
 1993: David Rubio (coach) (University of Arizona)

National High School Coach of the Year 
 2017 - Alexis Glover and Zack Young
 2016 - Jeni Case (Ursuline Academy, Cincinnati, OH) and Jan Barker, Amarillo High School, Amarillo, TX)
 2015 - Nancy Dorsey (St. James Academy, Lenexa, KS) and Jean Kesterson (Cathedral High School, Indianapolis, IN)
 2014 - Al Bennett (Westlake High School, Austin, TX) and Angie Spangenberg (Harlan Community High School, Harlan, IA)
 2013 - Kim Lauwers (A.J. Dimond High School, Anchorage, AK) and Jody DeGroot (Bellarmine Preparatory School, Tacoma, WA)
 2012 - Suzie Pignetti (Charlotte Latin School, Charlotte, NC) and Ron Kordes (Assumption High School, Louisville, KY)
 2011 - Jeff Carroll (Billings Senior High School, Billings, MT) and Susan Brewer (Bellville High School, Bellville, TX)
 2010 - Bill Morrin (Grantsburg High School, Grantsburg, WI) and Amy Steininger (Marion Local High School, Maria Stein, OH)
 2009 - Bret Almazan-Cezar (Archbishop Mitty High School, Santa Clara, CA) and Anita Boeck (Arlington High School, Arlington, SD)
 2008 - Todd Garvey (Mercy Academy, Louisville, KY) and Tom Turco (Barnstable High School, Hyannis, MA)

Hall of Fame

References

External links
AVCA website

Non-profit organizations based in Lexington, Kentucky
Volley
Volleyball organizations
 
Non-profit corporations
Sports organizations established in 1981
1981 establishments in Kentucky